In chemistry, disulfate or pyrosulfate is the anion with the molecular formula . Disulfate is the IUPAC name. 
It has a dichromate-like structure and can be visualised as two corner-sharing SO4 tetrahedra, with a bridging oxygen atom. 
In this anion, sulfur has an oxidation state of +6. Disulfate is the conjugate base of the hydrogen disulfate (hydrogen pyrosulfate) ion , which in turn is the conjugate base of disulfuric acid (pyrosulfuric acid).

See also
 Potassium pyrosulfate
 Sodium pyrosulfate
 Pyrophosphate
 Pyrocarbonate

References

 
Sulfur oxyanions